Complement 2 deficiency is a type of complement deficiency caused by any one of several different alterations in the structure of complement component 2.

It has been associated with an increase in infections.

It can present similarly to systemic lupus erythematosus (SLE).

References

External links 

Complement deficiency